Battle of Himera may refer to the following battles fought in Sicily:

Battle of Himera (480 BC), fought near the city Himera
Battle of the Himera River (446 BC), fought near either of the two rivers called Himera on Sicily
Battle of Himera (409 BC), resulting in the destruction of the city Himera
Battle of the Himera River (311 BC), fought near the Himera River, close to modern Licata